Articles on Model engine include:

 Jetex engine, a model rocket motor
 Live steam, for model steam locomotives
 Model engine, for model internal combustion engines
 Carbureted compression ignition model engine
 Glow plug (model engine)
 Model steam engine, for models of stationary steam engines
 Model Engine, an alternative rock band